Svēte parish is an administrative unit of Jelgava Municipality in the Semigallia region of Latvia (Prior to 2009 in the former Jelgava District).

Towns, villages and settlements of Svēte parish
  - parish administrative center
 Jēkabnieki
 Muzikanti
 Atpūta
 Ragumuiža
 Slapatas
 Vētras

References

External links

Parishes of Latvia
Jelgava Municipality
Semigallia